Joseph Wilfred Camille "The Eel" Henry (January 31, 1933 – September 11, 1997) was a professional Canadian ice hockey left winger who played for the New York Rangers, the Chicago Black Hawks and the St. Louis Blues in the National Hockey League.

Playing career
Born in Quebec City, Henry, nicknamed 'The Eel' played in the Quebec Junior Hockey League with the Quebec Citadelles during his junior career. Henry led the league in goals in 1951-52 with 52 goals and in 1952-53 with 46 goals. He also led the league in point scoring in 1951-52 with 114 points and was selected to the QJHL First All-Star Team in 1951-52 and in 1952-53. Henry also made an appearance in the 1953 Memorial Cup posting 21 points in 8 games.

Henry made his National Hockey League debut with the New York Rangers in 1953-54. He had his greatest success wearing number 21 for the New York Rangers. At 5 ft 7 in (1.70 m) and 150 lb (68 kg), he was the smallest man in the NHL at the time and suffered numerous injuries throughout his career. He was known for his ability to swat the puck out of mid air to score goals. He won the Calder Memorial Trophy as the National Hockey League rookie of the year beating out Jean Béliveau of the Montreal Canadiens. After playing 21 games with the Rangers the following season, Henry was traded to the Providence Reds of the American Hockey League. He was then loaned to the Quebec Aces in the Quebec Hockey League. Henry would return with the Reds in 1955-56, and he led the AHL in goals with 50. Henry would also lead the Reds to a Calder Cup championship and in the process, he scored 10 goals in 9 games to lead all players in playoff scoring.

In 1956-57, Henry returned to the Rangers. He split his time with the Rangers and the Reds that season, before playing for 7 straight seasons with only the Rangers. Camille was selected as a NHL Second All-Star Team left winger in 1957-58, the year he also won the Lady Byng Memorial Trophy for best sportsmanship combined with production.  In 1964-65, he was named Captain of the New York Rangers. He also played in the 1958, 1963 and 1964 NHL All-Star Games. In 1964-65, Henry was traded to the Chicago Black Hawks for Paul Shmyr. Henry played 22 games with the Black Hawks posting 8 points. During that season, Henry also made his first ever trip to the Stanley Cup Finals. The Black Hawks ended up losing in 7 games to the Montreal Canadiens.

He would return to New York in 1967-68, where he would split his time with the Buffalo Bisons in the AHL. Henry was traded to the St. Louis Blues in 1968-69 where he went to the Stanley Cup finals in 1969. He would play 2 seasons with the Blues before retiring.

Notable Appearances

On November 1, 1959 when Jacques Plante first wore a mask for protection in a game, Camille was the only player to score on him in that game.

On December 12, 1963 Camille participated in an NHL record when the Montreal Canadiens and the New York Rangers combined for the fastest three goals by two teams in NHL history.   Dave Balon and Gilles Tremblay scored for Montreal and Camille Henry scored for the Rangers, all within 18 seconds.  The record stood until Feb. 10, 1983.

Camille scored the first ever hat trick for the St. Louis Blues.

Post-playing career
Henry coached the Kansas City Blues of the Central Hockey League in 1969-70 and then coached the New York Raiders of the World Hockey Association but he never duplicated his early success.

He was married and divorced from Dominique Michel, famed Quebec chanteuse and comedian.

After his retirement Henry lived in Quebec City and held security jobs, eventually becoming essentially destitute. He was widely considered to have an alcohol consumption problem which was complicated by diabetes. He died shortly after receiving his first reimbursement for the players' pension fund which was awarded by the courts. Henry eventually ran the twin rinks in Totowa, New Jersey and Branchbrook Park in Newark.

Awards and achievements
Selected to the QJHL First All-Star Team in 1952 and 1953.
Calder Memorial Trophy winner in 1954.
Selected to the AHL First All-Star Team in 1956.
Calder Cup champion in 1956.
Played in 1958, 1963 and 1964 NHL All-Star Games.
Selected to the NHL Second All-Star Team in 1958.
Lady Byng Memorial Trophy winner in 1958.
 In the 2009 book 100 Ranger Greats, was ranked No. 21 all-time of the 901 New York Rangers who had played during the team's first 82 seasons
On November 1, 1959, when Jacques Plante donned a mask for the first time, Henry was the only player in that game to score on him.

Career statistics

Coaching record

References

External links
 

1933 births
1997 deaths
Buffalo Bisons (AHL) players
Calder Trophy winners
Canadian expatriate ice hockey players in the United States
Canadian ice hockey centres
Chicago Blackhawks players
Ice hockey people from Quebec City
Kansas City Blues players
Lady Byng Memorial Trophy winners
New York Rangers players
Providence Reds players
Quebec Aces (QSHL) players
Raiders/Golden Blades/Knights WHA franchise
St. Louis Braves players
St. Louis Blues players